Spycatcher (or Spycatcher: The Candid Autobiography of a Senior Intelligence Officer) is a book by former MI5 officer Peter Wright

Spycatcher may also refer to:

Counterintelligence agents, those who catch spies.
SpyCatcher protein, forming a covalent bond to SpyTag peptide.
Spycatcher (TV Series), a 1959 BBC series, based on the eponymous 1952 memoir by Oreste Pinto
Spycatcher (band), UK rock band formed in 2008
"Spy Catcher" (Spyforce episode), pilot episode of Australian TV series Spyforce
Spycatcher (2011 novel) a spy novel written under the pseudonym William Morrow, by Matthew Dunn (author)
"Spy Catcher Club", a fictional school club found in the children's novel and franchise Harriet the Spy

See also
 Spy (disambiguation)
 Catcher (disambiguation)
 :Category:Counterintelligence analysts
 The Catcher Was a Spy (1994 book) biography about Moe Berg
 The Catcher Was a Spy (film) 2018 biopic